Vernon Doyle Fewell (June 9, 1940 – September 26, 2015) was an American football and track coach. He served as the head football coach at Sul Ross State University in Alpine, Texas in 1978 and Texas Lutheran University in Seguin, Texas from 1981 to 1987, compiling a career college football coaching record of 31–44–1.

Fewell graduated from Texas Lutheran, where he lettered in football, basketball, and track. He earned a Master of Education degree from Southwest Texas State College—now known as Texas State University—in 1968. Fewell was hired at Sul Ross in 1977 as head track coach and assistant football coach under Paul Pierce. He succeeded Pierce as head football coach after the 1977 season.

Head coaching record

College football

References

1940 births
2015 deaths
American football quarterbacks
Sul Ross Lobos football coaches
Texas Lutheran Bulldogs football coaches
Texas Lutheran Bulldogs football players
Texas Lutheran Bulldogs men's basketball players
College men's track and field athletes in the United States
College track and field coaches in the United States
High school football coaches in Texas
Texas State University alumni
Sportspeople from San Antonio
Coaches of American football from Texas
Players of American football from San Antonio
Basketball players from San Antonio
Track and field athletes from San Antonio